Marina Munćan (born November 6, 1982, in Pančevo) is a Serbian former professional middle distance runner who specialised in the 1500 metres. She represented Serbia at the 2012 Summer Olympics. She holds multiple Serbian records. She is now the Head Cross Country and Assistant Track and Field Coach for Claremont-Mudd-Scripps, in Claremont, CA.

Running career

Collegiate
Munćan attended Villanova, for which she ran track and cross country. In addition to finishing in first place in various Big East middle-distance track races, Munćan earned 11  Big East Conference track and field championship titles, she earned 9 NCAA Division 1 All-American awards for NCAA Track championships in 2003, 2004,  2005 and 2006.

Post collegiate
She represented Serbia at the World Championships in 2007 and 2009 and European Championships in 2010 and 2012. At the 2009 Summer Universiade she won a gold medal in 1500 m with a time 4:15:53 minutes. She ran the women's 1500-m race at the 2012 Summer Olympics, barely missing qualification to the semifinal round recording a time of 4:11.25.

Major competition record

Personal bests

Outdoor

Indoor

References

External links
 
 
 Marina Muncan at All-Athletics
 
 
 

1982 births
Living people
Sportspeople from Pančevo
Serbian female middle-distance runners
Yugoslav female middle-distance runners
Olympic athletes of Serbia
Athletes (track and field) at the 2012 Summer Olympics
Villanova Wildcats women's track and field athletes
Serbia and Montenegro athletes
Universiade medalists in athletics (track and field)
Universiade gold medalists for Serbia
Competitors at the 2007 Summer Universiade
Medalists at the 2009 Summer Universiade
Athletes (track and field) at the 2005 Mediterranean Games
Mediterranean Games competitors for Serbia and Montenegro
21st-century Serbian women